Orgill is a large area in the town of Egremont, Cumbria which contains an estimated 1000 inhabitants.

Crab Fair
Orgill is part of one of the oldest fairs in history, as it is where the crab fair field is every year, which usually contains carnival style games, fair ground rides and performances from various local bands/entertainers.

Sport
Orgill is where the football team Windscale F.C is located who currently compete in the Wearside Football League, which has had various players who have played professional in the current squad such as Matt Henney and Graham Goulding who have both played for Workington A.F.C. One of the most famous players to come through the ranks at Windscale is Ryan Byrne who has played for Kenya national under-20 football team as he was eligible through his grandfather's origin.

Populated places in Cumbria
Borough of Copeland